Petalas (Greek: Πεταλάς) is the largest island (area ) of the Echinades, among the Ionian Islands group of Greece. , it had no resident population.

Some, including William Martin Leake, have suggested that Petalas is the site of ancient Dulichium, from which 40 ships sailed to Troy in the Iliad. However, Strabo and most modern authors have identified Dulichium as Makri, a nearby island in the Echinades.

Petalas, which is privately owned, was recently offered for sale under the name Dulichium for the asking price of US$44,622,936.19.

References

External links
Island of Petalas for sale
Petalas on GTP Travel Pages (in English and Greek)

Echinades
Islands of Greece
Islands of the Ionian Islands (region)
Landforms of Cephalonia